The Helpmann Award for Best Male Actor in a Supporting Role in a Play is a theatre award, presented by Live Performance Australia (LPA) at the annual Helpmann Awards since 2003. In the following list, winners are listed first and marked in gold, in boldface, and the nominees are listed below with no highlight.

Winners and nominees

Source:

See also
Helpmann Awards

References

External links
The official Helpmann Awards website

P
Awards for male actors